The 2019–20 All-Ireland Intermediate Club Football Championship was the 17th staging of the All-Ireland Intermediate Club Football Championship since its establishment by the Gaelic Athletic Association for the 2003–04 season.

The All-Ireland final was played on 25 January 2020 at Croke Park in Dublin, between Oughterard and Magheracloone Mitchells. Oughterard won the match by 2-16 to 0-12 to claim their first ever championship title.

All-Ireland Intermediate Club Football Championship

All-Ireland semi-finals

All-Ireland final

References

2019 in Irish sport
2020 in Irish sport
All-Ireland Intermediate Club Football Championship
All-Ireland Intermediate Club Football Championship